Lee Young-jin is a South Korean football manager and former player who was most recently the serves as an assistant coach of the Vietnam national team.

Club career 
He mostly played for Lucky-Goldstar Hwangso, which then changed their name to LG Cheetahs, Anyang LG Cheetahs and finally FC Seoul.

1986–1995, 1997: Lucky-Goldstar Hwangso/LG Cheetahs
1990: Sangmu FC (military service)  
1996: Oita Trinita

International career 
Lee Young-jin made his first appearance for the South Korean national team on 23 May 1989, in a 1990 FIFA World Cup qualifying match against Singapore.

He represented South Korea at the 1990 FIFA World Cup, the 1994 FIFA World Cup, the 1990 Asian Games, the 1990 Dynasty Cup, the 1992 Dynasty Cup and the 1994 Asian Games.

International goals
Results list South Korea's goal tally first.

Managerial career
On 22 December 2009, Daegu FC appointed Lee as manager. In the 2011 season, the club improved on previous season by finishing in 12th place, but the board decided that they terminated his contract.

In 2017, Lee became Park Hang-seo's assistant and brought success to Vietnamese football. Ironically, Park was his former teammate.

1997: Anyang LG Cheetahs (Player-manager)
1998–2004: FC Seoul (Manager)
2005: FC Seoul (Assistant manager)
2007–2009: FC Seoul (Assistant manager)
2010–2011: Daegu FC (Manager)
2013–2014: Cheongju University (Manager)
2015–2016: Daegu FC (Manager)
2017–: Vietnam & Vietnam U23 (Assistant manager)

Honours

Player 
Lucky-Goldstar Hwangso/LG Cheetahs
 K League Winners (1) : 1990
 K League Runners-up (2) : 1986, 1993
 League Cup Runners-up (2) : 1992, 1994

Manager 
Vietnam (as an assistant)
AFF Championship Winners: 2018
AFC U-23 Championship Runners-up: 2018
Southeast Asian Games Gold medal: 2019
Southeast Asian Games Gold medal: 2021

Individual 
 K League Best XI (1) : 1991

References

External links 
 
 Lee Young-jin – National Team Stats at KFA 
 
 

Daegu FC managers
1994 FIFA World Cup players
1990 FIFA World Cup players
K League 1 players
FC Seoul players
FC Seoul non-playing staff
Association football midfielders
South Korea international footballers
South Korean footballers
Footballers from Seoul
1963 births
Living people
Asian Games medalists in football
Footballers at the 1990 Asian Games
Footballers at the 1994 Asian Games
Asian Games bronze medalists for South Korea
Medalists at the 1990 Asian Games
South Korean football managers